Abdul Hamid al-Bakkoush (10 August 1933 – 4 December 2007) was Prime Minister of Libya from 25 October 1967 to 4 September 1968. After the proclamation of the Jamahiriya by Gaddafi, he went into exile to Egypt and became one of the leaders of the opposition to the Libyan government. He also held the office of Minister of Justice thrice between January 1964 and September 1968.

Prime Minister 
In 1968, during his term in office, Libya created, with Saudi Arabia and Kuwait, the Organization of Arab Petroleum Exporting Countries (OAPEC), in order to coordinate production, refining, transport, and commercialization of oil between the three countries. In July of that same year, Libya signed the Nuclear Non-Proliferation Treaty.

After premiership, he became the ambassador of Libya to France.

Opposition from exile 
During Gaddafi's presidency he went into exile, first to London and then to Paris. In 1977 he settled in Cairo, Egypt, where in 1982 he created the Libyan Liberation Organization, joining the Libyan National Salvation Front (LNSF), the opposition in exile.

Following the arrival of a suspected Libyan hit squad in Cairo, Egyptian officials faked his assassination on November 12, 1984, publishing staged photos in the press to get Libya to announce the assassination a success. Libya took the bait, and relations between Egypt and Libya, which were already poor, deteriorated even further.

See also 
History of modern Libya

References 

Prime Ministers of Libya
1933 births
2007 deaths
National Front for the Salvation of Libya politicians
Libyan exiles
Ambassadors of Libya to France
Justice ministers of Libya
Libyan lawyers
Cairo University alumni
Libyan emigrants to the United Kingdom
People from Tripoli, Libya
20th-century lawyers